The frontopontine fibers  are situated in the medial fifth of the base of the cerebral peduncles; they arise from the cells of the frontal lobe and then pass through the anterior limb of internal capsule at last end in the nuclei of the pons.

The frontopontine tract (tractus frontopontinus) refers to the combination of the fibers.

See also
 Paramedian pontine reticular formation

References

External links

 Diagram at neuropat.dote.hu

Pons
Frontal lobe
Cerebral white matter